Stalin Peak may refer to the former name of:
Ismoil Somoni Peak (Pamir), the highest point in Tajikistan and the former USSR
Gerlach Peak (Carpathians)